Bruno is a census-designated place (CDP) in Logan County, West Virginia, United States. Bruno has a post office with ZIP code 25611. As of the 2010 census, its population was 544.

References

Census-designated places in Logan County, West Virginia
Census-designated places in West Virginia
Populated places on the Guyandotte River